The 2014 Pittsburgh Panthers football team represented the University of Pittsburgh in the 2014 NCAA Division I FBS football season. The Panthers were led by head coach Paul Chryst and played their home games at Heinz Field. They were a member of the Coastal Division of the Atlantic Coast Conference (ACC). This was Pitt's second season as a member of the ACC. They finished the season 6–7, 4–4 in ACC play to finish in a tie for third place in the Coastal Division. They were invited to the Armed Forces Bowl where they lost to Houston.

On December 18, head coach Paul Chryst resigned to become the head coach at Wisconsin. He finished with a three-year record of 19–19. Offensive coordinator Joe Rudolph was the Panthers interim head coach in the Armed Forces Bowl.

Schedule

Coaching staff

Roster

Team players drafted into the NFL

References

Pittsburgh
Pittsburgh Panthers football seasons
Pittsburgh Panthers football